Nathaniel "Coyote" Peterson (born September 1, 1981) is an American YouTuber, wildlife educator, and host of Animal Planet's series Coyote Peterson: Brave the Wild. He is best known for his YouTube channel Brave Wilderness, which focuses on documenting and educating about animals. Peterson has also become known for videos in which he allows himself to be stung by bugs and animals, such as the bullet ant and the executioner wasp.

He hosts several others of his YouTube channel series including Breaking Trail, Beyond the Tide, Dragon Tails, Base Camp, Blue Wilderness, On Location and Coyote's Backyard. These series span many tropical and temperate locations, including much of the United States, Australia, Brazil, New Zealand, South Africa, Japan, the Bahamas, and Costa Rica.

His team includes cameramen Mark Vins and Mario Aldecoa, trained wildlife experts who occasionally present episodes themselves.

Animal Planet series
On November 16, 2018, it was announced that the Brave Wilderness crew would be creating a TV program on Animal Planet titled Coyote Peterson: Brave the Wild. A contract-signing episode was posted on their YouTube channel. The television special Coyote Peterson: Return to the Wilderness debuted on February 3, 2019. The series Coyote Peterson: Brave the Wild premiered on Animal Planet on February 9, 2020.

References

External links 

1981 births
Living people
American YouTubers
Ohio State University College of Arts and Sciences alumni
People from Geauga County, Ohio
Television personalities from Ohio